Mohammed Marouazi (born June 28, 1973) is a Moroccan actor currently based in Canada. He is most noted for his performance as Atif in the 2022 film Breathe (Respire), for which he received a Canadian Screen Award nomination for Best Supporting Performance in a Film at the 11th Canadian Screen Awards in 2023.

Personal life
He was formerly married to Moroccan actress Sana Akroud. They first announced in 2019 that they were divorcing, before revealing in February 2020 that they were reuniting, but confirmed their divorce in 2022.

Filmography

Films

Television

References

External links

1973 births
Living people
21st-century Moroccan male actors
Moroccan male film actors
Moroccan male television actors
Moroccan emigrants to Canada